Shahriar Emon (born 7 March 2001) is a Bangladeshi professional footballer who playes as a right-winger for Mohammedan SC. He is also an active soldier for the Bangladesh Army.

Early life
During his primary education years, Emon started off as a goalkeeper. But once he reached sixth grade, Saiful Islam who was his high school teacher in Khulna, changed his position to a forward and Emon made it to the school team within three years. While in pursuit of becoming a professional foobtballer, he faced strong resistance from his parents who wanted their eldest son of four children to build up his career in conventional means. In 2017, his career faced a standstill, after failing to pass his SSC examination. Nonetheless, he redeemed himself in the re-examinations with a 3.53 GPA, which convinced his parents to let him pursue football. The following year, he played in the Khulna First Division and Khulna Second Division leagues. In 2018, with advice from his mentor Prashant Das, Emon came to Dhaka to take part in the trials for the Mohammedan SC U18 team. After failing to make the cut during the trials, he enrolled in the Bangladesh Army, in 2019.

Club career
On 25 November 2021, Emon joined Mohammedan SC, after impressing the clubs former striker Alfaz Ahmed, who regularly trained the Bangladesh Army Football Team. With the Army Team he took part in the 2021 Independence Cup. On 2 December 2021, Emon scored the winning goal as Army caused a major upset by defeating his parent club Mohammedan 2–1 to reach the quarter-finals of the tournament.

On 22 June 2022, Emon scored a solo goal for Mohammedan in the league against arch-rivals Abahani Limited Dhaka. Although his team went on to lose the Dhaka Derby 2–4, his goal heaped praise from the local media.

International career
On August 2022, Bangladesh national team head coach Javier Cabrera, drafted Emon in the Bangladesh preliminary squad for the September FIFA window. Nonetheless, he failed to make the final squad. On March 2023, he was recalled to the team for a training camp held in Medina, Saudi Arabia.

Career statistics

Club

References

External links

 
Living people
2001 births
People from Khulna
Bangladeshi footballers
Association football wingers
Mohammedan SC (Dhaka) players
Bangladesh Football Premier League players